Prince Kpodo (born 29 August 1999) is a Ghanaian footballer who currently plays as a defender for Ghana Premier League side Cape Coast Ebusua Dwarfs.

Career 
Kpodo joined Ghana Premier League side Ebusua Dwarfs in January 2019 ahead of the 2019–20 season. He was an unused substitute during the first match of the season against Medeama. The following week, on 5 January 2020, he made his debut and played the full 90 minutes in a 2–0 loss to West African Football Academy. He went on and played 17 league matches before the COVID-19 pandemic struck and the league was cancelled. He made his first start of the 2020–21 season during the opening day 2–2 draw against rivals Elmina Sharks, which had goalkeeper Razak Issah scoring an 89th minute free-kick. On 24 April 2021, he played the full 90 minutes as Ebusua Dwarfs won by 4–1 against then second placed team, Great Olympics. He mostly played in a defensive quartet alongside Dennis Nkrumah Korsah, Godwin Adikah and Emmanuel Anaful.

References

External links 
 

Living people
1999 births
Association football defenders
Ghanaian footballers
Ebusua Dwarfs players
Ghana Premier League players